Gdańsk Żabianka railway station is a railway station serving the city of Gdańsk, in the Pomeranian Voivodeship, Poland. The station opened in 1975 and is located on the Gdańsk Śródmieście–Rumia railway. The train services are operated by SKM Tricity.

The name is derived from one of city quarters called Żabianka.

General information
An underpass leads to the platform, connecting both sides of tracks. There is a ticket office and few outlets located in the underway. The ticket office is opened from 5 am (6 am in the weekend) till 9 pm.

Train services
The station is served by the following services:

Szybka Kolej Miejska services (SKM) (Lębork -) Wejherowo - Reda - Rumia - Gdynia - Sopot - Gdansk

References

 This article is based upon a translation of the Polish language version as of November 2016.

External links

Railway stations in Poland opened in 1975
Railway stations served by Szybka Kolej Miejska (Tricity)
Zabianka